The Jim Rome Show is a sports radio talk show hosted by Jim Rome. It airs live for three hours each weekday from 9 a.m. to noon Pacific Time. The show is produced in Los Angeles, syndicated by CBS Sports Radio, and can be heard on affiliate radio stations in the U.S. and Canada. In January 2018, the show began simulcasting on television on CBS Sports Network.

History
The Jim Rome Show began on XTRA Sports 690 in San Diego. In 1996, Premiere Radio Networks picked up the program for national syndication. Sometime after, the show was shortened by one hour and the broadcast location was shifted from XTRA Sports 690 to the Premiere Radio Networks studio complex in Sherman Oaks, California. As part of the broadcast deal bringing Rome's TV show to CBS Sports Network, The Jim Rome Show became a charter program of CBS Sports Radio upon its full launch on January 2, 2013.

Show personnel ("The XR4Ti")

Tom Di Benedetto, executive producer, call screener since 2021
Alvin Delloro, engineer since 2005
James "Flight Deck" Kelley, digital program director since approximately 2010
Jack Savage, producer since February 2023

Former personnel
Brian "Whitey" Albers, engineer from 1996 to 2005
Keith Arnold, associate producer from 2016 to 2019
Kyle Brandt, producer and writer from 2007 until July 22, 2016
Robert Dozmati, associate producer from 2018 to 2019
Adam Hawk, executive producer and call screener from 2016 to July 23, 2021
Austin Huff, content screener from 2015 to 2018
Gerrit Ritt, producer from 2019 to January 30, 2023
Travis Rodgers, producer from 1996 to 2009
Jason Stewart, talent coordinator and call screener from 1999 to March 8, 2013
Dave Whelan, producer from 2007 to September 2, 2022

Show format and content
The three-hour program is a mixture of interviews, calls, emails, Tweets and Rome's own thoughts and analysis. The opening and closing theme is "Lust for Life" by Iggy Pop, and the show also uses "Welcome to the Jungle" by Guns N' Roses The program usually begins with headlines, when Rome highlights the main sports news of the day with his thoughts and opinions. Rome refers to his listeners as "Clones".

One of the main parts of the program is Rome reading emails and Tweets on air. He usually comments positively or negatively depending on the message. Ones he does not like are crumpled and thrown in the garbage. Many emails and Tweets are "smack talk", where the messenger is putting down someone in sports, pop culture, or even other listeners. 

Rome takes calls and ask callers to call in, though many times he does not take any of the calls at all. Rome's rules for calls is "have a take, don't suck." Calls that are good in his opinion will be racked, which means they will be saved for future use. Bad calls get buzzed and cut off, followed usually by humiliation from Rome. Some calls get neither and usually will be followed by brief analysis or thoughts by Rome.

The final segments of the show usually include e-mail and Twitter contests. Sometimes these contests include gift cards from one of Rome's sponsors, O'Reilly Auto Parts.

Friday episodes include the week rewind, known as "Alvin Delloro's Week that Was", which is a compilation of show highlights over the past week alongside a mix of music.

From February 11 to March 11, 2009, all of Rome's shows contained an interview with an individual with the given name Rex.

The Smack-Off
The Smack-Off is an annual competition on the show. It differs from every other show during the year in that there are no scheduled guests or takes from Rome. The entire show features the best callers on the show and serves as a way of determining the best caller in a given year. The event is invite only. 

Callers may qualify in a number of ways: 
past winners (along with some other long-time veteran callers) receive a life-time invite (they are allowed to go the entire year or even years without calling and would still be allowed to call that day)
building a body of work over a given year (there is no specific criterion but this typically involves getting numerous racked calls leading up to that year's event)
one-great call that blows Rome away (this is referred to as "ripping a golden ticket")
from 2010 to 2012, the winner of the Hack-Off received an automatic invitation

However, making a bad call could lose someone their invitation. Also, receiving an invite does not guarantee the caller will be able to get on the air. 

The Smack-Off is known as the most important day of the year in The Jungle. It is typically held in spring or early summer and is always on a Friday. It has been held annually since 1995. In addition to receiving the prestige of being the best caller in that given year, recent winners have also received a prize package. The 2015 and 2016 winner received a $5,000 grand prize. 

While receiving input from the listeners, the winner is picked solely by the XR4TI and is announced in the last segment of the show. There is no strict time limit, but Rome will run a caller if they start rambling too long. The winning criterion is subjective, as there are no set rules or criteria. However, the winning call is typically the person who comes up with some original smack for the other top callers, mixes in some sports takes, and brings something new to the event.

The Hack-Off
In 2010, as a complement to his annual show entitled The Smack-Off (which features the best callers on the show), Rome instituted The Hack-Off (which features the worst callers on the show). It was typically held a week before The Smack-Off, with the winner earning an automatic entry into that event. It was initially referred to as the "Eddie in Boise Invitational". Some of the more popular callers included Vinnie Mac, Matt in Cleveland (aka Tarzan), Eddie in Boise, Ryan in Wichita, Ray Ray in Tampa, Jolene in Farmington, and Jason (the star-linebacker) in Ottawa. It is still unclear if the winner of the event was the "worst of the worst" or the "best of the worst". Much to everyone's disappointment, Rome decided to cancel the Hack-off after the 2013 event. Despite the efforts of numerous clones, Rome has maintained his stance that the event will not return.

Past Winners:

2010: Vinnie Mac in Des Moines
2011: Ray Ray in Tampa
2012: Jolene in Farmington
2013: No Winner

Guest hosts
At length he announces when he is going to be "in the basement" (on vacation) and for how long. He justifies his frequent absences to the Clones by proclaiming, "I take a lot of vacation because I get a lot of vacation" (a parody of a comment made by Patrick Ewing during the 1998 NBA lockout). To ensure live content on days when Rome is absent, The Jim Rome Show is hosted by a rotating stable of guest hosts, including:
 KLAC/Fox Sports Radio radio personalities Petros Papadakis and Matt "Money" Smith. The pair, who host an afternoon show for the sports-talk radio station and Jim Rome Show affiliate, filled in for Rome on Presidents Day 2007 and during Fourth of July week that same year. They now fill at least one day each time Rome takes a week of vacation. They have also appeared on Jim Rome Is Burning.
 Comedian Jay Mohr. Mohr also occasionally calls in to Rome's show. He participated in the 2007 Smack-Off and finished in 7th place. When he appears in The Jungle, Mohr is referred to as "Slam Man". As of 2010, Mohr has become the most frequent guest host. He is now the host of a Fox Sports Radio program, Jay Mohr Sports, competing in the time slot of The Jim Rome Show.
 Pop culturists Randy and Jason Sklar (of the ESPN Classic program Cheap Seats), whose subject matters are rather random. Randy is also a frequent panel guest on Rome's ESPN program Jim Rome Is Burning. The Brothers Sklar often date themselves with their frequent discussions on 1980s athletes of professional tennis, professional wrestling and the St. Louis Cardinals. Bumper music when the Sklars host tends to be of the indie rock variety. In 2010 the Sklars became more frequent guest hosts as they launched a podcast with a similar format to their hosting of the Jim Rome Show. They call clones who are fans of theirs "sklones".
 Author and columnist John Feinstein. Feinstein's appearances are usually low-key in tone and dominated by interviews. He also appears frequently on the show as the subject of a Rome interview.
 Sportswriter Skip Bayless. When Bayless hosts, the show generally has a recurring theme, typical examples being his belief that the Ohio State Buckeyes stole the 2003 BCS Championship, his self-proclaimed addiction to Diet Mountain Dew, and his obsession with the beach volleyball scene in Top Gun (which Rome shares). Bayless also actively debates callers, as opposed to Rome, who rarely does so. Bayless is a polarizing and unpopular guest host, and many Clones call him "Skip Clueless." Rome, for his part, has no problem with Bayless and occasionally needles the Clones with the news that Bayless will be guest-hosting. Bayless has hosted the show less frequently since joining the cast of Cold Pizza/ESPN First Take.
 Former ESPN anchor and current NFL Network personality Rich Eisen. Eisen once commented that he had always thought the show's email address was "rome@habitate.com" until he guest-hosted. (The actual address is rome@haveatake.com, but Rome tends to say "haveatake" quickly.)
 Roger Lodge, host of Blind Date and a frequent interview guest on The Jim Rome Show. Lodge is also a frequent panel guest on Rome's ESPN program Jim Rome Is Burning. On both of Jim's shows, Lodge has taken to making the guarantee to shave his head, should a specific outcome occur. This is a guarantee that Lodge has always failed to follow through on.
 Former WDFN radio personalities Mike "Stoney" Stone and Bob "Wojo" Wojnowski. The pair, who hosted an afternoon show for the Detroit sports-talk radio station and Jim Rome affiliate, filled in for Rome on July 13, 2007. Stone has also appeared occasionally as a subject of Rome interviews.
 Kansas City Star sportswriter Jason Whitlock, who has also appeared as a subject of Rome's interviews.
 Grant Napear, former play-by-play announcer for the Sacramento Kings and sportscaster for KHTK-AM in Sacramento.

Former guest hosts of the show include:
 Boxing/Olympic analyst Jim Lampley. Lampley has been known to blast emailers for poor grammar and overall stupidity. Rome sometimes resets a Lampley rant in which he ridiculed the "media-driven hype" surrounding the year 2000 and how it was erroneously referred to as the beginning of the new millennium. Lampley has not hosted the show since being arrested in January 2007.
 Former Fox Sports Radio personality Andrew Siciliano (from Gametime Live). On May 12, 2006, while Siciliano was guest-hosting, a caller coined the term "teammateship" (referencing Barry Bonds as an example of bad "teammateship"). Andrew is referred to as "Van Whack", "Substitute Jim", or "Rome Junior" by many of the Clones, and as "Deep Dish" by Randy and Jason Sklar. Siciliano now hosts his own show with ex-Laker great Mychal Thompson on L.A's KSPN 710 (AM), which competes with the show, so he no longer has fill-in duty. However, Siciliano is a frequent panel guest on Rome's ESPN program Jim Rome Is Burning.
 Actors Jerry Ferrara and Kevin Connolly from HBO's Entourage hosted the show on August 15, 2007. The idea for Ferrara to host the show came about in an interview two weeks prior to Ferrara's guest-hosting, when Rome offered Ferrara a guest-host spot next time he goes on vacation, and Ferrara indicated his willingness to fill in as host.
 Former Fox Sports Radio personality Steve Czaban. He hosted several consecutive days in 2001 when Rome's son Jake was born, but no longer guest-hosts.
 Former author, journalist, and columnist Ralph Wiley also guest hosted shows for Rome before he died in 2004.

On holidays, the show airs "The Best of the Jim Rome Show", a retrospective episode of memorable interviews and segments.

Future of the show
Since its inception, The Jim Rome Show has always been offered on terrestrial radio, and has not been offered on satellite radio. The show is, however, offered on streaming and podcast through the official web site. On May 6, 2003, Rome made a return to television with  Jim Rome Is Burning on ESPN, and occasionally hinted about switching the radio program to satellite, or abandoning the radio program altogether, in favor of television full-time.

Rome is often quite vocal about his frequent displeasures with affiliates, specifically those who do not carry the entire three hours, air the show on tape delay, or frequently pre-empt the broadcast. Rome has openly admitted that he is intrigued by the idea of satellite radio and broadcasting the program free of affiliates' interference. However, he is also aware of some listeners' problems with paying for satellite radio, and has received numerous phone calls and e-mails from terrestrial radio listeners who have said that the humor of the show has brought them through difficult times or keeps them entertained at work.

On April 27, 2006, Rome stated that he will keep the radio program going, but initially made no commitment to satellite or terrestrial. On July 11, 2006, Rome announced that he signed a multi-year deal with Premiere Radio Networks to keep the show on terrestrial radio. In addition, he stated that the show may be simulcast on satellite radio in the future. Clear Channel provides content exclusively to XM Satellite Radio, including the entire Fox Sports Radio network.

In January 2013, the show moved to the CBS Sports Radio network. In October 2017, CBS Sports Network announced that it would add a simulcast of The Jim Rome Show to its afternoon lineup beginning January 2, 2018.

References

 When in Rome: Heterosexism, homophobia and sports talk radio David Nylund, GLAAD Center for Study of Media & Society (academic analysis of the show format, PDF document).

External links

 The Jim Rome Show — official site
 Jim Rome – Rome's page at Premiere Radio Networks' official website
 Stations which play the Jim Rome Show

American sports radio programs
CBS Sports Network original programming
Simulcasts
1996 radio programme debuts